John Bernard Haldane was an Anglican priest in the 20th century. He was born on 27 May 1881 and educated at Keble College, Oxford. Ordained in 1905 after a period of study at Ripon College Cuddesdon  he began his career as  Assistant Curate of St John East Dulwich after which he was Priest in charge of St John, Earlsfield. He was Precentor of Southwark Cathedral from 1919 to 1937 and then briefly its Provost. He died in post on  4 November 1938

References

1881 births
Alumni of Keble College, Oxford
Alumni of Ripon College Cuddesdon
Provosts and Deans of Southwark
1938 deaths